The Libertarian Party, also known as the Libertarian Party UK (LPUK), is a libertarian political party in the United Kingdom. Adam Brown has been the party's leader since August 2015.

The LPUK only stood candidates in England, Wales and Northern Ireland because a legal agreement with the Scottish Libertarian Party, and was also known as the LPoEWNI (England, Wales and Northern Ireland) so not to mislead voters into thinking it represents the whole of the United Kingdom. According to the agreement, after the Scottish Libertarian Party was statutorily deregistered by the Electoral Commission in November 2022, it can now stand candidates in Scotland.

History 
The party was founded in January 2008 under the leadership of Patrick Vessey, having registered the party with the Electoral Commission in November 2007. In May 2008, The Daily Telegraph leader writer Alex Singleton claimed the founders should have set up a pressure group rather than a party. Singleton believed the new party would reduce the influence of libertarianism.

On 17 September 2008, Vessey resigned as party leader and was replaced by Ian Parker-Joseph. The party claimed a membership of 1,000 and hoped in the wake of the parliamentary expenses scandal "to establish themselves in the media landscape with a couple of robust performances". He said the party wanted much smaller government and would initially cut taxation to 10% before removing it altogether.

On 28 November 2010, Andrew Withers was elected as party leader. He was one of the signatories of the agreement with the Scottish Libertarian Party, and reluctantly signed despite his displeasure of conceding ground to the new Scottish branch of the party.

Following an internal ballot on 15 August 2015, party members elected Adam Brown as the party leader.

During the 2018 local elections, the party was described as on "the fringes of mainstream British politics".

In October 2018, MEP Bill Etheridge, a former member of the UK Independence Party, joined the party and became its deputy chairman. Etheridge continued as a member of the Europe of Freedom and Direct Democracy parliamentary group in the European Parliament. However, he then left to join the Brexit Party in February 2019.

Electoral performance

General elections 

The party did not field parliamentary candidates at the 2015 general election, describing it as a "waste of time and funds".

By-elections 
 54th Parliament

 57th Parliament

See also 
 Classical liberalism
 Liberalism in the United Kingdom
 Libertarianism in the United Kingdom
 Right-libertarianism
 Scottish Libertarian Party

References

External links 
 Official website of the Libertarian Party
 Official website of the Scottish Libertarian Party 

2008 establishments in the United Kingdom
Political parties established in 2008
Libertarian parties in the United Kingdom
Libertarianism in the United Kingdom
Eurosceptic parties in the United Kingdom
Non-interventionist parties